List of long-term proposals received by Airports Commission is a list of the long-term proposals submitted to the United Kingdom's (UK) Airports Commission in July 2013 which suggest solutions as to how the UK can maintain its global hub aviation status. In December 2013 the commission announced a short list of three proposals for further study during 2014. The commission announced its preferred solution in July 2015.

Proposals

See also
 Expansion of Heathrow Airport
 Roskill Commission

References

External links
Proposals on the Airports Commission's website

United Kingdom aviation-related lists